Bois Brule Creek is a stream in Cole and Miller counties of Missouri. It is a tributary of the Osage River.

The source area for the stream lies just south of U.S. Route 54 north of Eugene. The stream flow eastward crossing under Missouri Route 17 and on east meandering northeast and passing under Missouri Route H before entering the Osage west of St. Thomas.

Bois Brule is a name derived from French meaning "burnt woods".

See also
List of rivers of Missouri

References

Rivers of Cole County, Missouri
Rivers of Miller County, Missouri
Rivers of Missouri